Love Me, Love My Money is a 2001 Hong Kong romantic comedy film written, produced and directed by Wong Jing, and starring Tony Leung Chiu-Wai, Shu Qi, Angie Cheung, Chun Cho, Lam Ka-Tung, Teresa Mak and Wong Yut Fei.

The original Chinese title for the film is Yau ching yum sui ba'u. It is a popular saying that literally translates as - When in Love, Even Plain Water Can Be a Filling Meal.

Summary
Richard Ma is a tightfisted, mean and unpleasant character.  He is also a wealthy businessman who has become increasingly bitter and mistrustful due to what he believes are the gold digging women in his life.

Following a series of events one weekend, Richard's financial assets are temporarily frozen, his house is looted by his bitter ex-girlfriend and he has no cash leaving him helpless and broke.

It is during this fateful weekend that he meets Choi; a struggling stockbroker who is trying ward off the attentions of an unwanted suitor from her local village.  By offering to help to Ah Choi in return for financial gain, a most surprising relationship develops between this unlikely pair.

Cast
 Tony Leung Chiu-Wai as Richard Ma (Bastard)
 Shu Qi as Choi
 Gordon Lam as Tom
 Teresa Mak as Fong
 Cho Chun
 Wong Yut-Fei

References to Hong Kong culture
 The film is a satirical reflection of the materialistic nature of modern Hong Kong society.
 Drinking games are popular in Hong Kong.  About 15 minutes into the film they play a drinking game called 'Millionaire'.  For this, everyone has to perform one of three gestures and each person takes turns to call them out.  If both people are doing the same gesture, the person calling wins and the other drinks.  Tony Leung and Shu Qi play another game a little while after called 'Liar'.

References

2001 romantic comedy films
2001 films
Films directed by Wong Jing
Hong Kong romantic comedy films
2000s Hong Kong films